Collette Gardiner (born 26 March 1986) is an Australian retired footballer who played as a midfielder, earning over 80 caps for the Australian national team. She last played for Perth Glory in the Australian W-League.

Playing career
Born in Scotland, McCallum emigrated to Australia with her family at the age of four. She played for Pali Blues in the American USL W-League in 2008. Following her debut game for the Blues, she was selected for the W-League team of the week as a result of scoring two goals against Ventura County Fusion. Pali Blues went on to win the W-League championship in that season.

In 2009, McCallum played for Sky Blue FC in the new Women's Professional Soccer in the United States. The club went on to win the 2009 Women's Professional Soccer Playoffs in their debut year.

International

McCallum amassed 81 caps for the Matildas. Following the retirements of Cheryl Salisbury and Joanne Peters in February 2010, she was named the Matildas vice captain.

As a youth representative McCallum represented the Young Matildas on 19 occasions, & was named in the FIFA All-Star Team at the 2006 FIFA U-20 Women's World Championship.

McCallum is arguably one of the best produced at her age group and was considered one of the best young talents in the world.

Such is her legacy at youth level that in 2019 Professional Footballers Australia named the Australian Young Player of the Year award the Collette McCallum Medal.

Coaching career
In 2015, she was employed as the Assistant Coach of the Perth Glory's Women's team, working with Head Coach Bobby Despotovski.

Career statistics

International goals
Scores and results list Australia's goal tally first.

Honours

Club
Pali Blues
 USL W-League: 2008

Sky Blue FC
 Women's Professional Soccer: 2009

Perth Glory
 W-League Premiership: 2014

Country
Australia
 AFC Women's Asian Cup: 2010
 OFC U-20 Women's Championship: 2002

See also

 Women's soccer in Australia
 Foreign players in the FA WSL

References

External links

 
 Australia player profile 
 Perth Glory player profile
 Women's Professional Soccer player profile
 Pali Blues player profile
 W-League player profile

1986 births
Living people
Australian women's soccer players
Perth Glory FC (A-League Women) players
NJ/NY Gotham FC players
Pali Blues players
2011 FIFA Women's World Cup players
Notts County L.F.C. players
USL W-League (1995–2015) players
New South Wales Institute of Sport alumni
Scottish emigrants to Australia
Sportspeople from Rutherglen
Australia women's international soccer players
Women's association football midfielders
Australian expatriate sportspeople in England
Expatriate women's footballers in England
2007 FIFA Women's World Cup players
Women's Professional Soccer players
Footballers from South Lanarkshire